The following is a list of the municipalities (comuni) of Friuli-Venezia Giulia, Italy.

There are 215 municipalities in the abolished provinces of Friuli-Venezia Giulia (as of January 2019):

25 in the Province of Gorizia
50 in the Province of Pordenone
6 in the Province of Trieste
134 in the Province of Udine

List

References

Istituto Nazionale di Statistica

 
Geography of Friuli-Venezia Giulia
Friuli-Venezia Giulia